SS John M. Clayton was an American Liberty ship built in 1942 for service in World War II. She was later acquired by the United States Navy and renamed USS Harcourt (IX-225).  Her namesake was John M. Clayton, an American senator from 1853 to 1856.

Description 

The engine was built by the Worthington Pump & Machinery Corporation, Harrison, New Jersey.

Construction and career 
John M. Clayton was laid down on 23 November 1942 at Los Angeles, California, by the California Shipbuilding Corp., under a Maritime Commission contract (M.C.E. Hull 687). She was launched on 27 December 1942 and sponsored by Mrs. Barbara Bechtel. the ship was completed on 8 January 1943.

Sailing for the American-Hawaiian Steamship Co., she carried war cargoes in both the Atlantic and Pacific Oceans until hit by a Japanese bomb on 2 January 1945 during the Mindoro landings in the Philippines. Based on Edwin Stauffacher's service on board the ship, he was awarded the Mariner's Medal, Combat Bar, Pacific War Zone Bar, Philippine Liberation Medal, Victory Medal and the Presidential Testimonial Letter. Her crew beached the ship before she went down; she was subsequently raised and taken to Pearl Harbor where the yard force working with customary efficiency and speed repaired the gaping hole in her port side. Acquired by the Navy on a bareboat basis, the ship commissioned as Harcourt (IX-225) on 22 June 1945.

Ready for service on 10 July 1945, Harcourt sailed for Eniwetok with fleet supplies. She then sailed for Tokyo, arriving on 17 September with a load of freight for the 3rd Fleet, and remained there to assist in the occupation until 31 March 1946, when she sailed for San Francisco. Harcourt arrived San Francisco on 22 April, decommissioned 17 May, and was delivered to the War Shipping Administration at Suisun Bay, California. She remained in the Suisun Bay Reserve Fleet in a damaged condition and later stricken rom the Naval Register on 5 June 1946, sold for scrap to Zidell Exploration Co., in 1962.

Awards 

 Asiatic-Pacific Campaign Medal
 World War II Victory Medal
 American Campaign Medal
 Navy Occupation Service Medal (with Asia clasp)

References 

 

Liberty ships
Ships built in Los Angeles
1942 ships
Maritime incidents in 1945